Michael McGinnis may refer to:

J. Michael McGinnis (born 1944), physician and public health scholar
Mike McGinnis (born 1973), American saxophonist, clarinetist, and composer
Michael McGinnis, American teacher and magician, creator of the 3D labyrinth game Perplexus

See also
Michael McGinniss, President of La Salle University